Until the start of the 1959 reorganization of Yugoslav People's Army known under codename "Drvar", each Aviation Regiment of the Yugoslav Air Force comprised three aircraft squadrons and one technical squadron, whose task was to prepare materials and supplies of all three aircraft squadrons. Aircraft squadrons were marked as 1st, 2nd and 3rd Squadron of some Aviation Regiment. There were also some independent squadrons and training squadrons of Aviation Divisions, liaison squadrons of Military districts and Aviation Corps, light combat aviation squadrons and liaison squadrons of Air Command.

After the application of the "Drvar" reorganization for the Air Force, from April 1961,  new type designation system is used to identify squadrons:
fighter aviation squadrons were given numbers from 120 onwards,
fighter-bomber aviation squadrons were given numbers from 235 onwards,
reconnaissance aviation squadrons were given numbers from 350 onwards,
light combat aviation squadrons were given numbers from 460 onwards,
anti-submarine aviation squadrons were given numbers from 570 onwards,
transport aviation squadrons were given numbers from 675 onwards,
helicopter squadrons were given numbers from 780 onwards,
liaison aviation squadrons were given numbers from 890 onwards.

WWII Squadrons

1st NOVJ Squadron
2nd NOVJ Squadron
Liaison Squadron of VŠ NOV i POJ
Squadron of 5th NOVJ Corps
1st Squadron of 5th NOVJ Corps
2nd Squadron of 5th NOVJ Corps
Mostar Squadron

Squadrons until 1961

Independent Squadrons

715th Independent Reconnaissance Squadron
122nd Hydroplane Liaison Squadron
27th Helicopter Squadron
16th Reconnaissance Squadron of Anti-Aircraft Artillery
34th Helicopter Squadron
48th Helicopter Squadron

Training Squadrons of Aviation Division

Training Squadron of 21st Aviation Division
Training Squadron of 29th Aviation Division
Training Squadron of 32nd Aviation Division
Training Squadron of 37th Aviation Division
Training Squadron of 39th Aviation Division
Training Squadron of 44th Aviation Division

Liaison Squadrons of Military districts and Aviation Corps

Liaison Squadron of 1st Military district
Liaison Squadron of 3rd Military district
Liaison Squadron of 5th Military district
Liaison Squadron of 7th Military district
Liaison Squadron of 3rd Aviation Corps
Liaison Squadron of 7th Aviation Corps

Light Combat Aviation Squadrons and Liaison Squadrons of Air Commands

Light Combat Aviation Squadron of 1st Air Command
Light Combat Aviation Squadron of 3rd Air Command
Light Combat Aviation Squadron of 5th Air Command
Light Combat Aviation Squadron of 7th Air Command
Light Combat Aviation Squadron of 9th Air Command
Liaison Squadron of 1st Air Command
Liaison Squadron of 3rd Air Command
Liaison Squadron of 5th Air Command
Liaison Squadron of 7th Air Command
Liaison Squadron of 9th Air Command

Squadrons after 1961

Fighter Aviation Squadrons
120th Fighter Aviation Squadron
121st Fighter Aviation Squadron
122nd Fighter Aviation Squadron
123rd Fighter Aviation Squadron
124th Fighter Aviation Squadron
125th Fighter Aviation Squadron
126th Fighter Aviation Squadron
127th Fighter Aviation Squadron
128th Fighter Aviation Squadron
129th Fighter Aviation Squadron
130th Fighter Aviation Squadron

Fighter-Bomber Aviation Squadrons
229th Fighter-Bomber Aviation Squadron
235th Fighter-Bomber Aviation Squadron
236th Fighter-Bomber Aviation Squadron
237th Fighter-Bomber Aviation Squadron
238th Fighter-Bomber Aviation Squadron
239th Fighter-Bomber Aviation Squadron
240th Fighter-Bomber Aviation Squadron
241st Fighter-Bomber Aviation Squadron
242nd Fighter-Bomber Aviation Squadron
243rd Fighter-Bomber Aviation Squadron
245th Fighter-Bomber Aviation Squadron
247th Fighter-Bomber Aviation Squadron
249th Fighter-Bomber Aviation Squadron
251st Fighter-Bomber Aviation Squadron
252nd Fighter-Bomber Aviation Squadron
334th Fighter-Bomber Aviation Squadron

Reconnaissance Aviation Squadrons
350th Reconnaissance Aviation Squadron
351st Reconnaissance Aviation Squadron
352nd Reconnaissance Aviation Squadron
353rd Reconnaissance Aviation Squadron
354th Reconnaissance Aviation Squadron
355th Reconnaissance Aviation Squadron

Light Combat Aviation Squadrons
460th Light Combat Aviation Squadron
461st Light Combat Aviation Squadron
462nd Light Combat Aviation Squadron
463rd Light Combat Aviation Squadron
464th Light Combat Aviation Squadron
465th Light Combat Aviation Squadron
466th Light Combat Aviation Squadron
467th Light Combat Aviation Squadron

Anti-Submarine Aviation Squadrons
570th Anti-Submarine Aviation Squadron
571st Anti-Submarine Aviation Squadron

Transport Aviation Squadrons
675th Transport Aviation Squadron
676th Transport Aviation Squadron
677th Transport Aviation Squadron
678th Transport Aviation Squadron
679th Transport Aviation Squadron

Helicopter Squadrons
711th Anti-Armored Helicopter Squadron
712th Anti-Armored Helicopter Squadron
722nd Anti-Armored Helicopter Squadron
713th Anti-Armored Helicopter Squadron
714th Anti-Armored Helicopter Squadron
780th Transport Helicopter Squadron
781st Transport Helicopter Squadron
782nd Transport Helicopter Squadron
783rd Helicopter Squadron
784th Anti-Submarine Helicopter Squadron
787th Transport Helicopter Squadron
789th Transport Helicopter Squadron
790th Transport Helicopter Squadron
890th Transport Helicopter Squadron

Liaison Aviation Squadrons
890th Liaison Aviation Squadron
891st Liaison Aviation Squadron
892nd Liaison Aviation Squadron
893rd Liaison Aviation Squadron
894th Liaison Aviation Squadron
895th Helicopter Reconnaissance and Liaison Squadron
896th Helicopter Reconnaissance and Liaison Squadron
897th Helicopter Reconnaissance and Liaison Squadron
898th Helicopter Reconnaissance and Liaison Squadron

Other Squadrons
333rd Mixed Aviation Squadron
525th Training Aviation Squadron
676th Fire-Fighting Aviation Squadron
678th Mixed Aviation Squadron
3rd Mixed Aviation Squadron of 105th Regiment
3rd Fighter-Bomber Aviation Squadron of 107th Helicopter Regiment

Notes and references

Yugoslav Air Force 1942-1992, Bojan Dimitrijević, Institute for modern history, Belgrade, 2006